Couple or couples may refer to :

Basic meaning
Couple (app), a mobile app which provides a mobile messaging service for two people
Couple (mechanics), a system of forces with a resultant moment but no resultant force
Couple (relationship), two people to whom each is the significant other of the other
Couple, a set of two of items of a type
Couple, a name for one pair of rafters
Thermocouple, a type of temperature sensor

People
Fred Couples (born 1959), golfer

Arts, entertainment, and media

Films
Couples (film), a 2011 South Korean film
Couples (TV film), a 1994 American television film directed by Betty Thomas
The Aryan Couple, a 2004 British film released in the United States as The Couple
A Couple, 2022 film directed by Frederick Wiseman

Literature
Couples (novel), a novel by John Updike

Music
Couple, English market release title of 《연인》 (Yeonin, "lovers") Kim Yeon-woo 2004
Couples (Pizzicato Five album), 1987
Couples (The Long Blondes album), 2008
"Couples", song by Pizzicato Five from Bellissima! 1998
"Couples", song by The Tyrades from The Tyrades 2003
"Couples", song by David Allan Coe from David Allan Coe discography
Le Couple, a Japanese band

Television
The Biggest Loser: Couples, fifth season of "The Biggest Loser"
The Biggest Loser: Couples 2, seventh season of "The Biggest Loser"
The Biggest Loser: Couples 3, ninth season of "The Biggest Loser"
The Biggest Loser: Couples 4, eleventh season of "The Biggest Loser"
The Biggest Loser Australia: Couples, fourth season of "The Biggest Loser Australia"
The Biggest Loser Australia: Couples 2, fifth season of "The Biggest Loser Australia"
The Biggest Winner Arab: Couples, the fourth season of "The Biggest Winner Arab"

See also
 Coupler (disambiguation)
 Coupling (disambiguation)
 Decoupling (disambiguation)
 Odd Couple (disambiguation)
 Uncouple (disambiguation)

2 (number)
Couples